State Highway 14 is a state highway in between Bharatpur and Narnaul in the Indian state of Rajasthan.

Route 
Deeg,
Nagar,
Meo ka Baroda,
Baggar ka Tiraha,
Alwar,
Jindoli,
Tatarpur,
Sodawas,
Sahibi River Bridge
Barrod,
Behror,
Narnaul,
Bharatpur,
Dhera,
Nadbai,
Kherli,
Nagar,
Alwar

See also 
 List of state highways in Rajasthan

References 

 State Highways in Rajasthan